The Frank J. Von Ach House is a historic building located on the east side of Davenport, Iowa, United States. It has been listed on the National Register of Historic Places since 1984.

History
Francis J. Von Ach was a traveling salesman for the August Steffen Company, a wholesale dry goods dealer. Prior to his association with Steffen, he worked as a salesman in smaller retail establishments. Von Ach was also a founder, and held leadership positions in, the Tri-City Travelers Association, which was a professional organization for traveling salesmen. Von Ach was the first occupant of this house.

Architecture
The Von Ach house is a combination of the Queen Anne and the Colonial Revival styles. This combination was popular in turn of the 20th-century in Davenport. The Queen Anne style is found in the pinwheel plan, the variety of surface textures employed, and the irregular window placement. What is essentially a Victorian style structure is modified by the addition of the Neoclassical style porch, the aedicular frame surrounding the main entrance, and the Adamesque decorative details of the Colonial Revival.

References

Houses completed in 1896
Colonial Revival architecture in Iowa
Queen Anne architecture in Iowa
Houses in Davenport, Iowa
Houses on the National Register of Historic Places in Iowa
National Register of Historic Places in Davenport, Iowa
1896 establishments in Iowa